James Breathitt Jr. (December 14, 1890 – October 29, 1934) was an American politician from Kentucky.

Breathitt was born on December 14, 1890, in Hopkinsville, Kentucky.

Breathitt was educated at Centre College.

Breathitt served in the Kentucky State Senate and then later as the 35th Lieutenant Governor of Kentucky from 1927 to 1931, under Governor Flem D. Sampson.  Sampson was a Republican; Breathitt was a Democrat.

After catching pneumonia, Breathitt died at age 43 on October 29, 1934.

James Breathitt Jr. was the uncle of later Governor of Kentucky Edward T. Breathitt.

External links 
 Press release on Kentucky inaugurations noting relationship with Gov. Breathitt
 Obituary

1890 births
1934 deaths
People from Hopkinsville, Kentucky
Centre College alumni
Democratic Party Kentucky state senators
Lieutenant Governors of Kentucky
Deaths from pneumonia in Kentucky
20th-century American politicians